Montfaucon is a commune in the Gard department in southern France. The town lies on the right bank of the Rhône.

Population

See also
Communes of the Gard department

References

Communes of Gard